Danilo Javier Tosello (born March 27, 1969) is a retired Argentine football (soccer) player. During his career, he won 4 championships in Honduras with Olimpia.

Tosello is the 9th highest all time goalscorer in  the Liga Nacional de Honduras.

He was accused of money laundering in Honduras in 2016, he left his job as CD Olimpia's coach in January 2013 and returned to his home town in Argentina allegedly because of his father's poor health.

Honours and awards

Player
C.D. Olimpia
Liga Profesional de Honduras: 2000–01 A, 2002–03 A, 2003–04 C, 2004–05 C, 2005–06 A, 2005–06 C

Manager
C.D. Olimpia
Liga Profesional de Honduras: 2011–12 A, 2011–12 C, 2012–13 A

External links
 Argentine Primera statistics
 En Una Baldosa

1969 births
Living people
Footballers from Santa Fe, Argentina
Argentine footballers
Argentine expatriate footballers
Deportivo Español footballers
Tigres UANL footballers
Defensor Sporting players
Club Atlético Belgrano footballers
C.D. Olimpia players
Expatriate footballers in Honduras
Expatriate footballers in Mexico
Expatriate footballers in Uruguay
Liga Nacional de Fútbol Profesional de Honduras players
C.D. Olimpia managers
9 de Julio de Rafaela players
Association football midfielders
Argentine football managers